Clara Alfonso Freyre (born 12 August 1961) is a Cuban fencer. She competed in the women's individual and team foil events at the 1980 Summer Olympics.

References

External links
 

1961 births
Living people
Cuban female foil fencers
Olympic fencers of Cuba
Fencers at the 1980 Summer Olympics
Pan American Games medalists in fencing
Pan American Games gold medalists for Cuba
Pan American Games bronze medalists for Cuba
Fencers at the 1979 Pan American Games
Fencers at the 1983 Pan American Games
Medalists at the 1983 Pan American Games
21st-century Cuban women
20th-century Cuban women
20th-century Cuban people